Gouveia is a Portuguese surname. Notable people with the surname include:

André de Gouveia (1497–1548), Portuguese humanist and pedagogue
Pedro Álvares de Gouveia Cabral (1467–1520), Portuguese explorer, first European to Brazil
Antônio Gouveia (known as Carlão) (b. 1965), Brazilian volleyball player
Inácio Henrique de Gouveia, Brazilian military leader
Kurt Gouveia (b. 1964), American football linebacker
Lata Gouveia (b. 1975), Blues singer
Patrícia Gouveia (b. 1987), Portuguese footballer
Ricardo Gouveia, real name of Rigo 23 (b. 1966), Portuguese muralist and painter and political artist
Tami Gouveia, Massachusetts politician
Tala Gouveia (b. 1993), British actress
Teodósio de Gouveia (1889–1962), Portuguese Cardinal of the Roman Catholic Church
Teresa Patrício de Gouveia (b. 1946), Portuguese politician
Tiago Gouveia (b. 2001), Portuguese footballer
Wilson Gouveia (b. 1978), Brazilian mixed martial arts participant

See also
Gouveia Municipality, Portugal, Portuguese city
Gouveia (disambiguation) for other uses

Portuguese-language surnames